Soundtrack to the Apocalypse is a box set by the American thrash metal band Slayer. Released November 25, 2003 through American Recordings, the four–disc CD and DVD set features music from previous albums, unreleased material, and live film. A deluxe edition version (which has the alias "ammo box") was released and featured everything from the standard edition, with the addition of 14 live tracks. The box set's name originated from an alternative title for 2001's God Hates Us All. After discussing among themselves the idea of the box set, the band informed their record company, who initially disliked but later approved the idea.

Many dates were stated by band members as to when it would be released. The official release date was not announced until late October 2003. The box set has been released into the public domain five times between late 2003 to early 2007. There were several producers and film directors that were involved with the box set. The set received positive reviews from critics, but was not well received by fans, with the set debuting on no notable charts.

Conception
Around the time Slayer thought of the album title for 2001's God Hates Us All,  Soundtrack to the Apocalypse was considered an alternative name. Vocalist Tom Araya then suggested that if they ever opted to issue a box set,  Soundtrack to the Apocalypse would be the most appropriate title. This inspired discussion regarding a possible box set release, which continued for several months. The group decided that once the label agreed to a release, they would be given a little more time to compile the material. Slayer approached the record company regarding a box set release, and discussions lasted roughly a year, since the band had to negotiate with the record company concerning plans they had with the box set which were not in their contract. In September 2003, the record company granted permission to issue the box set and wanted an immediate release for the holiday season.

Slayer submitted a range of material for the record company to choose from, instructing them to return a track list of what they felt to be the best items. Following this, Slayer looked at the returned material; if the recorded track was a “good” performance but the band "didn’t care for the song", they asked the record company to select another track.

Guitarist Kerry King commented "there's tons of stuff on there", citing the amount they had to choose from as a problem. King himself owned five large Tupperware storage boxes full of material amassed over the years. Having every magazine had ever seen the group inside, King also possessed roughly 70 VHS and 8mm videos dating back to 1983. Nick John of Slayer’s management team sifted through every video and transferred them to DVD.

Production
Soundtrack to the Apocalypses ideal release date was in early November 2003. However, on September 25, 2003, it was announced by employees of MTV that the box set's release date had been pushed back to November 18, 2003. On October 23, 2003, employees of MTV announced that the box set's release date was pushed back to November 25, 2003. Since November 25, 2003, Slayer has released the box set five different times. The first three times were each released in 2003, the first being released through Universal Records, and the other two, one being a Deluxe Edition version, were released through American Recordings.  The set's fourth release, which was packaged with only three discs, was released through American Records in 2006. The box set's final release was in 2007, where it was released through WEA International. It was also released in the United Kingdom on December 8, 2003. It was produced with three Compact Discs, one DVD, and a booklet.

The packaging was praised by PopMatters, insisting that the box set is "very nicely packaged, in a swanky fold-out digipak with a clear plastic slipcase. The 72-page accompanying booklet is outstanding, with extensive liner notes, loads of photos, and many memories from the band members." USA Today related: "[it is] a combination of the metal grinders' best-known tracks, with live and studio rarities plus 17 DVD selections. A deluxe edition ($100) adds a live disc and a few souvenir extras." Soundtrack to the Apocalypse was produced by Matt Hyde, Dino Paredes, Rick Rubin, D. Sardy, and Andy Wallace and was executively produced by Nick John and Rick Sales. The film on the fourth disc was directed by Di Puglia, Gerard. The set includes many Slayer tracks since 1986 with several rarities and b-sides, and includes a remastered DVD of live performances spanning 20 years. A fifth disc was released with fourteen more tracks than the set's standard edition. The bonus live tracks were recorded at The Grove In Anaheim, California, on May 2, 2002, several months following the return of original drummer Dave Lombardo. The extra tracks are packaged in a "blood pack" sleeve, which is decorated with faux blood and skulls.

Reception

Although it did not enter any charts, Thom Jurek from AllMusic praised Soundtrack to the Apocalypse, rewarding the box set with four out of five stars. Jurek said it had "a whopping four CDs and one DVD." Jurek noted that discs one and two "feature tracks from Reign in Blood, and all the albums that proceed from it, and includes bonus cuts previously only released in Japan, and cuts from soundtracks." He also said that the third disc "is, appropriately, titled 'Shit You Never Heard' because that's what it is — sixteen tracks that have been unissued anywhere — from rehearsals, to in-concert recordings, demos, and one 'No Remorse,' a collaboration with Atari Teenage Riot, from the Spawn soundtrack," and that the fourth disc are "an electronic press kit video for Diabolus in Musica, and an appearance at the Kerrang magazine awards." Adrien Begrand from PopMatters favoured the album, lauding the packaging but stating that "like any other CD box set that has come out in recent years, the band seems torn about whom to appeal to, longtime fans, or newcomers."  Begrand noted that the first disc "is especially great, as it captures Slayer at the peak of their career, starting with the classic 1986 album Reign in Blood." PR Newswire said it was "a Slayer fan's ultimate experience," and The Dallas Morning News called it "a fat new audiovisual box set."

Track listing

Personnel
Slayer
Tom Araya – bass, vocals
Jeff Hanneman – guitar
Kerry King – guitar
Dave Lombardo – drums on disc #1 tracks 1–18, disc #2 track 15, disc #3 tracks 1–7, 10–11 and 16–17, disc #4 tracks 1–10 and 15–17, disc #5 tracks 1–14
Paul Bostaph – drums on disc #2 tracks 1–14 and 16–22, disc #3 tracks 12 and 14–15, disc #4 track 14
Jon Dette – drums on disc #4 track 11

Production

Rick Sales – executive producer, worldwide representation
Nich John – executive producer, worldwide representation, DVD producer
Kevin Estrada – co-executive producer, photography
Rick Rubin – American recordings
Dino Paredes – American recordings
Sanctuary Artist Management – worldwide representation
Vlado Meller – mastering
Steve Kadison – mastering-assistant
Adam Abrams – project coordination
Jeff Fura – DVD producer
Kelly McFadden – DVD menu design
Dave Wright – DVD authoring
Scott Sill – DVD authoring
Paul Kirsch – DVD editing
George Fitz – DVD editing
Vartan – art direction
t42design – art direction, design
Mark Weiss – photography
Doug Goodman Archive – photography
Slayer Archives – audio & visual materials
Marc Paschke – essay & liner notes
Eric Braverman – essay & liner notes
Michael Kachko – marketing
Scott D. Harrington – legal
John Dittmar – booking agent
Scott Sokol – booking agent
John Jackson – booking agent
Bill Vuylsteke – business management
Angela DeSimone – business management
Monroe Grisman – merchandise
Ted Mattes – merchandise

References

Albums produced by Andy Wallace (producer)
Albums produced by Dave Sardy
Albums produced by Rick Rubin
2003 compilation albums
Slayer compilation albums
American Recordings (record label) compilation albums